Marko Milošević (born 17 June 1952 in Romanovci, SFR Yugoslavia) is a retired Bosnian footballer and manager.

Managerial career
After concluding his playing career Milošević was named head coach of Sloga Trn in Banja Luka, after that he changed clubs like FK Omladinac Banja Luka, Krila Krajine, FK Laktaši. He was also the coach of many Hungarian teams like FC Szeged, FC Csongrad, FC Fortuna Ujpest and Makó FC. In the year 2014 he accepted the offer of Slovakian Fortuna league team, FC ViOn Zlaté Moravce.

References

External links
 at fcvion.sk
 at fcvion.sk
[3] Interview for www.sportske.ba

1952 births
Living people
People from Gradiška, Bosnia and Herzegovina
Association football midfielders
Yugoslav footballers
NK Opatija players
HNK Šibenik players
HNK Orijent players
NK Rudar Velenje players
NK Jadran Poreč players
Rayo Vallecano players
Yugoslav expatriate footballers
Expatriate footballers in Spain
Yugoslav expatriate sportspeople in Spain
Bosnia and Herzegovina football managers
FK Laktaši managers
FC ViOn Zlaté Moravce managers
Bosnia and Herzegovina expatriate football managers
Expatriate football managers in Hungary
Bosnia and Herzegovina expatriate sportspeople in Hungary
Expatriate football managers in Slovakia
Bosnia and Herzegovina expatriate sportspeople in Slovakia